Rexhe Bytyçi (Serbo-Croat: Redže Bitiči) (born 5 May 1987) is an Albanian footballer who plays as a striker.

He lived in Austria for many years which means he is eligible to play for Albania, Austria and Kosovo. During the 2006–07 season, Bytyci was on trial with the reserve team of the Spanish side Real Betis Balompié, but he didn't pass the test.

References and notes

External links
 
 

1987 births
Living people
People from Istog
Sportspeople from Peja
Kosovo Albanians
Kosovan footballers
Albanian footballers
Association football forwards
2. Liga (Austria) players
Austrian Regionalliga players
SK Vorwärts Steyr players
UD Las Palmas players
SC Schwanenstadt players
Racing Club Portuense players
SV Grödig players
SV Horn players
DSV Leoben players
TSV Hartberg players
LASK players
SK Austria Klagenfurt players
Union St. Florian players
Albanian expatriate footballers
Albanian expatriate sportspeople in Austria
Kosovan expatriate sportspeople in Austria
Expatriate footballers in Austria
Albanian expatriate sportspeople in Spain
Expatriate footballers in Spain
Kosovan expatriate sportspeople in Spain